DMHS may refer to:

 Dalton L. McMichael High School, in Mayodan, North Carolina
 Danbury Museum and Historical Society, in Danbury, Connecticut
 Del Mar High School, in San Jose, California, U.S.
 Desert Mountain High School, in Scottsdale, Arizona, U.S.
 Downtown Magnets High School, in Los Angeles, California, U.S.
 Drayton Manor High School, Hanwell, Ealing, England
 Dubai Modern High School, in Dubai, U.A.E
 Duncan MacMillan High School, in Sheet Harbour, Nova Scotia, Canada